Phyllonorycter endryella is a moth of the family Gracillariidae. It is known from the Iberian Peninsula, southern France, Corsica, Sardinia and Maghreb.

The larvae feed on Quercus coccifera, Quercus ilex and Quercus suber. They mine the leaves of their host plant. They create a large, lower-surface tentiform mine. The mine causes the leaf margin to fold.

References

endryella
Moths of Europe
Moths of Africa
Moths described in 1855